Gibberula dens is a species of sea snail, a marine gastropod mollusk, in the family Cystiscidae.

References

bensoni
Gastropods described in 1865
Cystiscidae